Royal Thimphu College is a private college in Thimphu, Bhutan under the Royal University of Bhutan. It is Bhutan's first private college.

The campus is located in an area of 25 acres of land in Ngabiphu, a rural area in Thimphu dzongkhag, located 7 km from the national capital city of Thimphu. The college has a number of linkages with institutions of higher education abroad.

History
The college was inaugurated on 18 July 2009 by Her Majesty, Ashi Kesang Choeden Wangchuck. It is affiliated to the Royal University of Bhutan, and offers undergraduate degrees in a variety of fields under the auspices of the University. Royal Thimphu College has since established a number of international partnerships, including with Wheaton College in the United States, the alma mater of the Fifth King of Bhutan, His Majesty Jigme Khesar Namgyel Wangchuck. In 2016, the College became the first in Bhutan to be accredited by the Bhutan Accreditation Council (BAC), which awarded it its highest grade of A+.

Departments
Royal Thimphu College has four broad departments; namely the departments of business studies, social sciences, IT, mathematics, and the humanities. As an affiliated college of the Royal University of Bhutan, Royal Thimphu College offers a variety of RUB-prescribed majors in one or more of these departments. The majority of students belong to the business department. Other departments originally offered only double majors, although some single major degrees have since been introduced in the fields of English studies and environmental management.

The college also has its football team, competing in the Bhutan Premier League.

References

External links
 Royal Thimphu College

Universities in Bhutan
Thimphu District
Educational institutions established in 2009
2009 establishments in Bhutan